The Oxford Book of English Verse, 1250–1900 is an anthology of English poetry, edited by Arthur Quiller-Couch, that had a very substantial influence on popular taste and perception of poetry for at least a generation. It was published by Oxford University Press in 1900; in its india-paper form it was carried widely around the British Empire and in war as a 'knapsack book'. It sold close to 500,000 copies in its first edition. In 1939, the editor revised it, deleting several poems (especially from the late 19th century) that he regretted including and adding instead many poems published before 1901 as well as poems published up to 1918. The second edition is now available online.

Various successors have subtly differentiated titles. See Oxford poetry anthologies.

Dedication
"To the President and Fellows and Scholars of Trinity College Oxford / a house of learning; ancient, liberal, humane, and my most kindly nurse"

The Oxford Book of English Verse 1250–1918 (1939 edition)

Revision also by Quiller-Couch. Poets included were:

Footnotes

External links

Project Gutenberg Book of English Verse
The Oxford Book of English Verse at Bartleby.com
PDF edition at djm.cc 
Google Books

1900 poetry books
1900 anthologies
English poetry anthologies
English Verse, Oxford Book